Shamelin Perkasa is a township in Kuala Lumpur, Malaysia. It is located between Maluri, Cheras and Pandan Indah, Selangor.

Suburbs in Kuala Lumpur